The Pan American Women's Handball Championship was the biennial official competition for senior national handball teams of North, Center, Caribbean and South America. It was organized by the Pan-American Team Handball Federation. In addition to crowning the Pan-American champions, the tournament served as a qualifying tournament for the IHF World Women's Handball Championship. In 2018, the PATHF was folded and the tournament was replaced with the North American & Caribbean and South and Central American Women's Handball Championships.

Summary

Medal table

Participation history

External links
Handball America Archive (todor66.com)

 
Pan-American Team Handball Federation competitions
Recurring sporting events established in 1986
Recurring sporting events disestablished in 2018